Danville Community High School (DCHS) is a public high school located in Danville, Indiana. DCHS enrolls students from grades nine through twelve and is operated by the Danville Community School Corporation. Danville is part of the Sagamore Conference (IHSAA). The school's mascot is the Warriors, and the school colors are crimson and gray.

Demographics
802 students were enrolled at DCHS for the 2017-2018 school year. 91.9% are white, 1.4% are black, 1.5% are Hispanic, 1.6% are Asian and 3.4% are multiracial. 18.2% of students qualify for free lunches and 7.7% qualify for reduced price lunches.

Academics
All benchmarks are for the 2016-2017 school year. 
ACT Composite Score: 23
SAT Composite Score: 1,101
Graduation Rate: 92.2%

Notable alumni

John Cravens, registrar of Indiana University from 1895 to 1936.
John Groce, current head coach of the Akron Zips men's basketball team.
Dick Passwater, NASCAR / USAC Stock Car driver
Bob Snyder, musician known for playing tenor sax, alto sax, clarinet, and flute.
Travis Steele, current head coach of the Xavier Musketeers men's basketball team.
Jordan Weidner, professional basketball player.

See also
 List of high schools in Indiana

References

External links
 Danville Community Schools

Public high schools in Indiana
Educational institutions established in 1963
Schools in Hendricks County, Indiana
1963 establishments in Indiana